Jabo may refer to:

 Jabo people, an ethnic group in Liberia  
 Jabo language, in Liberia
 Jabo (Nigeria), a village in Sokoto State
 An abbreviation for the German term  for fighter-bomber aircraft

People with the given name or nickname
 Jabo Ibehre (born 1983), British footballer
 Harvey "Jabo" Jablonsky (1909–1989), US Army major general and College Hall of Fame football player
 John "Jabo" Starks (1938–2018), American musician
 J. T. "Jabo" Waggoner (born 1937), American politician
 Jabo Williams (c. 1885–1953 or 1954), African-American blues musician

See also
 Jabbo, a nickname
 
 

Lists of people by nickname